Gordon Hope Grant (1875-1962) was an American artist, well-known for his maritime watercolors, and his work with the American Boy Scouts.  He was born in San Francisco in 1875, and died in 1962.

His best known work is likely his watercolor of the USS Constitution.  He also produced war time posters during WW I, and illustrations for books such as Penrod, and magazine covers for periodicals such as Saturday Evening Post and illustrations for Boys' Life. He was the cover designer for the first edition of the Boy Scout Handbook in 1911 (The 1910 edition was a stopgap blending "Baden-Powell’s Scouting for Boys that had been published in England in 1908 and his (Seton's) own Birch Bark Roll used by the Woodcraft Indians ").

He was illustrator for The Story of American Sailing Ships by Charles S. Strong, The Scarlet Plague by Jack London, Eternal Sea: An Anthology of Sea Poetry edited by William Martin Williamson and many other works.

He was a member of the Association of American Artists and many of his prints were sold through it.

His brother, Douglas Grant was also a watercolorist, and his nephews include Gordon Kenneth Grant (1908–1940), an artist who painted the murals in the Ventura, California post office, and Campbell Grant (born 1909).  Campbell Grant is heard in several Walt Disney films, and is credited with some of the story development for Fantasia (1940),  character development in Pinocchio (1940), and illustrated a book on the Chumash Indians of Channing Peak.

References

External links

Artists of the American West
American watercolorists
Artists from California
American marine artists
The Saturday Evening Post people
1875 births
1962 deaths
Scouting pioneers